Microsoft Flight Simulator is a 1986 video game developed by Sublogic and published by Microsoft for the Macintosh.

Development
In 1984 Amiga Corporation asked Artwick to port Flight Simulator for its forthcoming computer, but Commodore's purchase of Amiga temporarily ended the relationship. Sublogic instead finished a Macintosh version, released by Microsoft, then resumed work on the Amiga and Atari ST versions.

Notable features included a windowing system allowing multiple simultaneous 3D views - including exterior views of the aircraft itself.

Reception
Frank Boosman reviewed the game for Computer Gaming World, and stated, "As a game, FS is exciting. Flying beneath the Golden Gate Bridge was a big thrill, and really had me sweating. FS wins as a simulation as well; the flight characteristics of the Cessna and Lear Jet seem realistic, and the instrumentation is complete."

References

External links
Microsoft Flight Simulator at MobyGames
Review in Macworld

1986 video games
Classic Mac OS games
Classic Mac OS-only games
Microsoft Flight Simulator
Video games developed in the United States